Jennifer Hodge de Silva (28 January 1951 – 5 May 1989) was an African-Canadian filmmaker. Her film, Home Feeling: Struggle for a Community, revealed tensions between and police and residents of the Jane and Finch neighbourhood of Toronto.  The residents were mainly immigrants from Jamaica and Africa. She worked consistently with national organizations such the National Film Board of Canada (NFB) and the Canadian Broadcasting Corporation (CBC). She was the first black filmmaker to do so.

Career
In 1978 she worked with Terence Macartney-Filgate on the film Fields of Endless Day as assistant director and associate producer while she was a student. The next year she worked with him again as associate producer of the CBC documentary Dieppe 1942. She covered stories about the lives of Chinese-Canadian immigrants and Indigenous artists and covered social issues in diverse neighbourhoods.

Cameron Bailey, a Canadian film critic and artistic director of the Toronto International Film Festival, acknowledged her work in his 1990 article later published in a film anthology. In his 1990s publications Bailey honoured the work of black filmmakers such as Jennifer Hodge de Silva. The forms of production in which she worked were 'marginalized'.

Home Feeling: A Struggle for Community
Her 1983 documentary Home Feeling: A Struggle for Community, examining the relations between the police force and the black community, continues to be used in classrooms to this day.

Personal life
Jennifer Hodge de Silva comes from a family of women social activists — her grandmother, Anna Packwood and her daughters, Mairuth Vaughan Hodge Sarsfield (married to Cullen Squire Hodge) and Lucille Vaughn Cuevas.

Selected filmography

References

1951 births
1989 deaths
Black Canadian filmmakers
Canadian documentary film directors
Canadian people of African descent
Film directors from Montreal
Canadian women film directors
Canadian women documentary filmmakers
Glendon College alumni